Hendrik "Henry" Bekkering (born November 26, 1985) is a Canadian former professional basketball player who holds a Dutch passport as well. Bekkering is the elder brother of Ross Bekkering, who is a professional basketball player as well.

College career
Bekkering initially attended Eastern Washington University in the United States where he played both basketball and American football as a placekicker before leaving to return to Canada to attend the University of Calgary and play for the Dinos; he was drafted in the fifth round of 2007 CFL Draft by the Calgary Stampeders but ultimately did not play professional Canadian football.

While playing for the Calgary Dinos, Bekkering scored 41 points in a game in 2009. It was the first time a Calgary Dino scored over 40 points since 1997.

Professional career
Bekkering started his career in 2009 in the Netherlands with Matrixx Magixx. He played one year for GasTerra Flames before returning to the Magixx. In 2013, Bekkering retired.

References

1985 births
Living people
Basketball people from Alberta
Canadian expatriate basketball people in the United States
Canadian men's basketball players
Donar (basketball club) players
Dutch Basketball League players
Dutch men's basketball players
Eastern Washington Eagles men's basketball players
Matrixx Magixx players
People from Taber, Alberta
Shooting guards
Small forwards
Calgary Dinos men's basketball players